USS Paul Hamilton (DD-307) was a  built for the United States Navy during World War I.

Description
The Clemson class was a repeat of the preceding  although more fuel capacity was added. They had a crew of 6 officers and 108 enlisted men.

Performance differed radically between the ships of the class, often due to poor workmanship. The Clemson class was powered by two steam turbines, each driving one propeller shaft, using steam provided by four water-tube boilers.

The ships were armed with four 4-inch (102 mm) guns in single mounts and were fitted with two 1-pounder guns for anti-aircraft defense. In many ships a shortage of 1-pounders caused them to be replaced by 3-inch (76 mm) guns. Their primary weapon, though, was their torpedo battery of a dozen 21 inch (533 mm) torpedo tubes in four triple mounts. They also carried a pair of depth charge rails. A "Y-gun" depth charge thrower was added to many ships.

Construction and career
Paul Hamilton, named for Paul Hamilton, was launched 21 February 1919 by Bethlehem Shipbuilding Corporation, San Francisco; sponsored by Miss Justin McGrath; and commissioned 24 September 1920. After acceptance trials off California, Paul Hamilton was assigned to Division Thirty-three, Squadron Six, Flotilla Two of the Cruiser-Destroyer Force Pacific based at San Diego. She performed yeoman service with the Pacific Battle Fleet from 1920 until early 1930. Paul Hamilton decommissioned 20 January 1930 and was scrapped in 1931.

See  for other ships of this name.

Notes

References

External links
http://www.navsource.org/archives/05/307.htm
 

Clemson-class destroyers
Ships built in San Francisco
1919 ships